Marcus Blake Schneider (born April 28, 1973, in Lubbock, Texas) is an American former rower for the University of Washington. He competed in the 1996 Atlanta Olympic Games as well as the 2000 Sydney Olympic games. He won a bronze medal in 1996, and finished 6th in 2000. He attended Cascade High School in Everett, Washington.

References

External links
 
 
 

1973 births
Living people
American male rowers
Sportspeople from Lubbock, Texas
Rowers at the 1996 Summer Olympics
Rowers at the 2000 Summer Olympics
Olympic bronze medalists for the United States in rowing
Medalists at the 1996 Summer Olympics
Olympic silver medalists for the United States in rowing
Pan American Games medalists in rowing
Pan American Games gold medalists for the United States
Rowers at the 1999 Pan American Games
Medalists at the 1999 Pan American Games